Fatherhood may mean:

 being a father, a male parent of a child
 Fatherhood (album), a 1995 album by the British musician Stephen Jones
 Fatherhood (book), a 1986 bestselling book by Bill Cosby
 Fatherhood (TV series), a United States animated television series
 Father Hood, a 1993 comedy film starring Patrick Swayze
 Fatherhood (film), a 2021 American drama film
 Snoop Dogg's Father Hood, a 2007 reality show starring rapper Snoop Dogg